Fryer is a surname.

List of people with the surname Fryer
Bernie Fryer
Brian Fryer
Eric Fryer (actor), Canadian actor
Eric Fryer (baseball) (born 1985), American baseball catcher
Frederick William Richard Fryer
John Fryer (1671–1726), pewterer and Lord Mayor of London
John Fryer (music), record producer
John Fryer (sailor) (1753–1817), officer on the Bounty
John E. Fryer, M.D., American psychiatrist and gay rights activist 
Katherine Fryer (1910–2017), English artist
Miranda Fryer, actress
Nelson Fryer (1818-1896), American farmer and politician
Peter Fryer, writer
Richard Fryer (cinematographer) (1894–1953), born Morris Kolsky, British-born Hollywood cinematographer
Richard Fryer (politician) (1770–1846), banker, landowner and British Whig politician
Roland G. Fryer Jr, economics professor
William Fryer

See also
Freyr
Fryar
Fryars, British musician
Friar, Christian religion.

English-language surnames